Jai Jai Garavi Gujarat ("Victory to Proud Gujarat") is a poem written by Gujarati poet Narmadashankar Dave in 1873. It is used as a state anthem during ceremonies of the Government of Gujarat.

Composition
Narmad is considered the first modern Gujarati writer. He wrote the poem in 1873 as the foreword of his first Gujarati dictionary, Narmakosh.

In this poem, Narmad epitomises the sense of pride in the region by identifying the region of Gujarati people. He delineates the boundary within which the Gujarati-speaking population live: Ambaji in the north; Pavagadh in the east; Kunteshwar Mahadev near Vapi in the south; and Somnath, Dwarka in the west. This region mentioned by him now forms modern-day Gujarat, the western state of India. At the end of the poem, Narmad gives hope to the people of Gujarat that the dark clouds is lifting, and a new dawn is about to emerge.

In 2011, the composition sung by various Gujarati singers was released by Government of Gujarat.

Lyrics

See also

 List of Indian state songs

References

External links
Jai Jai Garavi Gujarat

Indian poems
Gujarati-language poems
Indian state songs
Symbols of Gujarat